The 1967–68 Scottish Second Division was won by St Mirren who, along with second placed Arbroath, were promoted to the First Division. Stenhousemuir finished bottom.

Table

References 

 Scottish Football Archive

Scottish Division Two seasons
2
Scot